This list includes military trucks, are in production for 2021. Previous models are in a separate table, which is below.

In the column "Company" indicates the manufacturer of the truck, in the column "truck" model name is indicated, in the column "image" is a photograph of the model, in the "Type" column indicates the type of model payloads, here is submitted designations such as "chassis for missile launchers units", "tankovoz "pickup"; in the column "years of production" represents years of release. Some images provided below may show the outdated model

This is not a complete list

Current vehicles

Previous models
"n" -"now" in column "the armies which countries now used" denotes trucks in service currently.

See also
Truck
Pickup Truck
List of trucks
List of pickup trucks

References

Trucks
Trucks
Truck-related lists